The synagogue of Delos, Greece, is one of the oldest synagogues known today, its proposed origin dating between 150 and 128 BCE, although its identification as a synagogue has been disputed.

Discovery and excavation
The structure was discovered in 1912 by a team led by archaeologist André Plassart.

Location
Located on the eastern side of the city of Delos, the building was far from the central areas of the city. Instead, it was built in a section of Delos called the "Stadium Quarter". In this part of the city, in contrast to the religious and commercial focus at Delos' centre, residences dominated the scene and there was also a small, easily accessible port.

Description
The dominating feature of the building is the large hall, which was presumably used in a flexible way, with moveable furniture, since there is no evidence for benches built along the walls. The hall is oriented towards the east, with a series of secondary rooms at the southern end.

The structure itself consisted of two large rooms containing a throne and multiple marble benches as well as many smaller rooms which allowed for access to a reservoir.

Purpose
The building's most recent use is widely agreed to have been an assembly hall for Jews or Samaritans. However, the first use for the building is more controversial. While some people think the building was erected as a private house or a pagan meeting place, most believe that it was a synagogue even in its earliest form.

Pro
The structure is interpreted to have been in use as a synagogue until the end of the second century AD.

Against

The identification of the building as a Jewish synagogue at any point in its history has been a matter of debate. The original identification of the building as a synagogue by Plassart was based in large part on a dedicatory inscriptions referring to "Theos Hypsistos", or "God Most High", often considered an appellation for the Jewish God in antiquity, though not exclusively. The identification of the building as a synagogue was originally challenged by Belle Mazur in 1935, though this argument has gone largely unnoticed by more recent scholarship. The evidence of "synagogue" architecture and inscriptions is complicated by the apparent presence of a contemporary Samaritan community not far from the building. More recent studies have concluded that the evidence suggesting that this building was indeed a synagogue is tenuous at best and will no doubt remain an open question. Matassa argues that neither the physical, literary, or epigraphic evidence supports the identification of the building as a synagogue. The construction of benches around the internal walls is used by some as an argument for a synagogue, although this seating arrangement is also known from two pagan temples and other buildings on Delos. Those who accepted Plassart's identification pushed the date from which on the structure is supposed to have served as a synagogue to its early phases, although the benches were only added in its last phase.

See also
 French School at Athens
 List of oldest synagogues

References

Samaritans
Ancient synagogues
Synagogues in Greece
Synagogue
Hellenistic Greece
Ancient Jewish Greek history
2nd-century BC establishments in Greece
Buildings and structures in the South Aegean
Samaritan culture and history